The preliminary stages of the 2010 Copa Sudamericana de Clubes are:
 First Stage, contested by 16 teams in 8 two-legged ties. The winner of each tie will advance to the Second Stage.
 Second Stage, contested by 30 teams, 8 of whom advanced from the First Stage, in 15 two-legged ties. The winner of each tie will advance to the Round of 16, joining the defending champion, LDU Quito.

First stage

|-

|}

Match A

Colo-Colo 3–3 Universitario on points. Universitario advanced on away goals.

Match B

River Plate 3–3 Guaraní on points. Guaraní advanced on away goals.

Match C

Barcelona advanced on points 6–0.

Match D

Atlético Huila advanced on points 4–1.

Match E

Oriente Petrolero advanced on points 4–1.

Match F

Defensor Sporting advanced on points 4–1.

Match G

Universidad San Martín 3–3 Deportivo Quito on points. Universidad San Martín advanced on away goals.

Match H

Santa Fe 3–3 Deportivo Lara on points. Santa Fe advanced on goal difference.

Second stage

|-

|}

Match O1

San José advanced on points 4-1.

Match O2

Independiente advanced on points 4–1.

Match O3

Peñarol advanced on points 6–0.

Match O4

Palmeiras 3–3 Vitória on points. Palmeiras advanced on goal difference.

Match O5

Santa Fe advanced on points 4–1.

Match O6

Avaí 3–3 Santos on points. Avaí advanced on goal difference.

Match O7

Deportes Tolima 3–3 Oriente Petrolero on points. Deportes Tolima advanced on goal difference.

Match O9

Unión San Felipe 3–3 Guaraní on points. Unión San Felipe advanced 8–7 on penalties.

Match O10

Banfield advanced on points 4–1.

Match O11

Emelec 3–3 Universidad San Martín on points. Emelec advanced on goal difference.

Match O12

Atlético Mineiro advanced on points 4–1.

Match O13

Universitario advanced on points 4–1.

Match O14

Goiás advanced on points 4–1.

Match O15

Note: This is the largest margin of victory in the history of the Copa Sudamericana.

Sport Huancayo 3–3 Defensor Sporting on points. Defensor Sporting advanced on goal difference.

Match O16

Newell's Old Boys advanced on points 4–1.

References

External links
Match schedule

Preliminary stages